Ashkenazi is a surname of Jewish origin. It is most commonly found in countries with large Jewish populations such as the United States, Russia and Israel.

The surname is sometimes spelled "Ashkenazy".

People 
Abraham Ashkenazi, 19th-century rabbi, Chacham Bashi of Jerusalem
Adi Ashkenazi (born 1975), Israeli actress, comedian and television host
Amir Ashkenazi (born 1971) Israeli businessman
Bezalel Ashkenazi, 16th-century rabbi and Talmud scholar 
Dan Ashkenazi (13th century), German Talmudist
David Ashkenazi (1915–1997), Russian pianist, accompanist and composer
Eliezer ben Elijah Ashkenazi (1512–1585), rabbi, Talmudist, and physician
Gabi Ashkenazi (born 1954), former Chief of the Israel Defense Forces General Staff
Goga Ashkenazi (born 1980), Kazakh-Russian businesswoman
Israel Sarug Ashkenazi (16th century), pupil of Isaac Luria
Jacob ben Isaac Ashkenazi (1550–1625), rabbi and author of the Tseno Ureno
Judah Ashkenazi (18th century), rabbi and author of the Ba'er Hetev
Léon Ashkenazi (1922–1996), French rabbi and Jewish leader
Lior Ashkenazi (born 1969), Israeli actor
Malkiel Ashkenazi (16th century), Sephardic rabbi in Hebron
Meir Ashkenazi (16th century), envoy of the Khan of Crimea
Menachem Ashkenazi (1934–2000), Israeli football referee
Mordechai ben Hillel Ashkenazi (1250–1298), German rabbi and legal authority
Moses Ashkenazi (died 1701), also known as Johann Peter Spaeth, German convert to Judaism
Motti Ashkenazi (born 1940), Israeli reserve captain
Tzvi Ashkenazi (1656–1718), rabbi of Amsterdam
Yisroel ben Shmuel Ashkenazi of Shklov (1770–1839), Lithuanian Talmudist
Yitzhak Ashkenazi (1534–1572), also called Isaac Luria, rabbi and mystic, founder of an important branch of Kabbalah

References 

Hebrew-language surnames
Jewish surnames